Poranthalum Ambalaiya Porakka Koodathu is a 1993 Indian Tamil-language comedy film written, directed and filmed by N. K. Viswanathan. The film stars Pandiarajan and Aishwarya. It was released on 25 September 1993.

Plot

Cast 
 Pandiarajan
 R. Sundarrajan
 Vennira Aadai Moorthy
 Vinu Chakravarthy
 Aishwarya
 Srividya
 Kovai Sarala
 K. R. Savithri

Production 
Poranthalum Ambalaiya Porakka Koodathu was directed by N. K. Viswanathan who also wrote the screenplay and worked as cinematographer. The film was produced by T. S. Sethuraman and T. S. Saravanan under Kalyan Cine Productions. V. Udhayasankaran was the editor.

Soundtrack 
The soundtrack was composed by Bala Bharathi. Lyrics written by Pulamaipithan, Muthulingam and Kalidasan.

Release and reception 
Poranthalum Ambalaiya Porakka Koodathu was released on 25 September 1993. Malini Mannath of The Indian Express called it a "crass film" but lauded Vishwanathan's cinematography.

References

External links 
 

1990s Tamil-language films
1993 comedy films
1993 films
Films directed by N. K. Vishwanathan
Indian comedy films